Paul Reddick  is a Canadian blues singer, songwriter and harmonica player. He was the founder of the group The Sidemen, active from 1990 until the early 2000s.

History
Born in Toronto, Ontario, Reddick began playing the harmonica at the age of 12.  In 1990, he formed The Sidemen, a blues band based out of Toronto, which toured and recorded until the early 2000s. The Sidemen's album Rattlebag (2001) was nominated for a Juno, as well as a W.C. Handy Award. In 2002, The Sidemen also won three Maple Blues Awards, including Album of the Year, and Songwriter of the Year.  Reddick was also the 2008 Maple Blues Award winner as Songwriter of the Year. Reddick was also nominated as Harmonica Player of The Year, losing to Steve Marriner.

Reddick's songs have been used in such feature films as Two If by Sea, Triggermen, Niagara Motel and The Evel Knievel Story, in addition to the television series Due South, Dawson's Creek, 15 Love and Madison. In 2006, the Coca Cola Company used the song "I'm A Criminal", from Rattlebag, in a US commercial for Coca Cola Classic.

Discography

With The Sidemen
1992 The Sidemen
1995 When The Sun Goes Down
1999 Dig In
2001 Rattlebag (Northern Blues)

Solo
2004 Villanelle (Northern Blues)
2009 SugarBird (Northern Blues)
2012 WishBone (Northern Blues)
2016 Ride The One (Stony Plain)

Compilations and compilation inclusions
2003 Johnny's Blues: A Tribute To Johnny Cash (Northern Blues)
2006 Saturday Night Blues: 20 Years (CBC)
2007 Reddick Revue (Northern Blues)

References and notes

External links
Paul Reddick official website
 NorthernBlues official website

Year of birth missing (living people)
Living people
Musicians from Toronto
Canadian blues singers
Blues harmonica players
Juno Award for Blues Album of the Year winners
Stony Plain Records artists
Northern Blues Music artists